Lyudmyla Stanislavivna Dzhyhalova (also Lyudmila Dzhigalova, ; born 22 January 1962) is a retired athlete who competed mainly in the 400 metres. She trained at Spartak in Kharkiv and represented the Soviet Union and the Unified Team.

She was born in Kharkiv and competed for the USSR in the 1988 Summer Olympics, where she placed third in the 4 x 400 metres relay heats with the team, but was substituted by Tatyana Ledovskaya in the finals. Four years later Dzhigalova competed for the Unified Team in the 1992 Summer Olympics held in Barcelona, Spain in the 4 x 400 metres where she won the gold medal with her team mates Yelena Ruzina, Olga Nazarova and 400m silver medalist Olga Bryzgina.

She received a four-year ban from athletics after failing a drugs test, having been positive for steroids in an out-of-competition test.

See also
List of doping cases in athletics

References

External links

1962 births
Living people
Sportspeople from Kharkiv
Ukrainian female sprinters
Soviet female sprinters
Olympic athletes of the Soviet Union
Athletes (track and field) at the 1988 Summer Olympics
Olympic athletes of the Unified Team
Olympic gold medalists for the Unified Team
Athletes (track and field) at the 1992 Summer Olympics
World Athletics Championships medalists
World Athletics Championships athletes for the Soviet Union
European Athletics Championships medalists
Spartak athletes
Doping cases in athletics
Ukrainian sportspeople in doping cases
Soviet sportspeople in doping cases
Medalists at the 1992 Summer Olympics
Medalists at the 1988 Summer Olympics
Olympic gold medalists in athletics (track and field)
Universiade medalists in athletics (track and field)
Goodwill Games medalists in athletics
Universiade silver medalists for the Soviet Union
World Athletics Indoor Championships medalists
World Athletics Championships winners
Competitors at the 1990 Goodwill Games
Competitors at the 1986 Goodwill Games
Olympic female sprinters